Carlos Alberto Ballesta Edreira (born 14 January 1955) is a Spanish retired footballer who played as a defender, and a current manager.

External links

1955 births
Living people
Spanish footballers
Footballers from Galicia (Spain)
Sportspeople from the Province of A Coruña
People from A Coruña (comarca)
Association football defenders
Segunda División players
Segunda División B players
Deportivo de La Coruña players
Spanish football managers
Segunda División managers
SD Compostela managers
CD Lugo managers